McCollum is an unincorporated community in Walker County, Alabama, United States.

History
McCollum is named for the McCollum family, who were early settlers of the area. A post office operated under the name McCollum from 1903 to 1909. It is located where State Route 69 and State Route 124 split.

Notes

Unincorporated communities in Walker County, Alabama
Unincorporated communities in Alabama